Arthur Greiner (April 28, 1884 – May 24, 1917) was an American racecar driver, and historically the first to finish last in the Indianapolis 500. Greiner crashed on the backstretch after completing twelve laps in the inaugural race. His riding mechanic Sam Dickson was killed in the accident, becoming the first Indianapolis 500 fatality.

He died at the Milwaukee Sanitarium at age 32 following a nervous breakdown.

Indy 500 results

See also
 List of Indianapolis fatalities

References

Indianapolis 500 drivers
1884 births
1917 deaths
Racing drivers from Chicago